Aziza Brahim (born June 9, 1976) is a Sahrawi singer and actress.

Biography

Life
She was born in 1976 in the Sahrawi refugee camps, in the Tindouf region of Algeria where her mother had settled in late 1975, fleeing from the Moroccan occupation of Western Sahara. Her father remained in El Aaiun where he later died. Due to the Western Sahara War, Aziza never met him.

Growing up in the severe conditions of the desert camps, Aziza discovered music as both a source of entertainment and a natural way to express and communicate her personal emotions and thoughts of resistance.

At the age of 11, she received a scholarship to study in Cuba, like many Sahrawi students at the time. She wanted to study music, but was rejected. She left school and returned to the refugee camps in 1995, pursuing her musical career. Since 2000 she has lived in Spain, first in León and later in Barcelona. She is married and she has a daughter.

Her grandmother is the renowned Sahrawi poet Al Khadra Mabrook.

Career
In 1995, she won the "1st National Song Contest", in the National Culture Festival of the Sahrawi Arab Democratic Republic. She then joined the "National Sahrawi Music Group", touring Mauritania and Algeria. In 1998 she contributed with two songs to the collective album "". That year she toured Europe with and the Sahrawi group , visiting Spain, France and Germany. In 1999 she returned to the refugee camps, recording a session for the Sahrawi National Radio with Tuareg musicians from Tamanrasset, Algeria. In 2005, she collaborated with the Spanish Latin jazz band Yayabo. In 2007 she created the group , composed of musicians from Western Sahara, Spain, Colombia or Senegal, mixing traditional African music with blues and rock, recording with them in 2008 her first solo work, the EP "". In 2009 she collaborated on a song of the collective rap EP "", and one song from her EP was featured in the compilation album "Listen to the Banned". Since 2009, Aziza Brahim has been regularly touring Spain and France with the Basque txalaparta group Oreka Tx, in the "" tour.

In 2011, she became involved in the Spanish film , composing, producing and interpreting the original soundtrack, as well as acting for the first time in a film.

In February 2012, Reaktion released Brahim's first LP, entitled "" in honor of her grandmother, for June. In April, Efe Eme magazine reported that Brahim would take part in the 2012 edition of the WOMAD Cáceres festival.

In 2014 Aziza Brahim released her third album  (Glitterbeat, 2014), an acoustic record featuring musicians from both the Barcelona and Malian music scenes and incorporating Malian, Spanish, Cuban and contemporary Anglo-European influences in addition to Brahim's traditional Sahrawi sound. Soutak topped the World Music Charts Europe (WMCE) three times (March, April and May 2014).

Discography

Studio albums
 2008 Mi Canto EP
 2011 OST Wilaya
 2012 Mabruk
 2014 Soutak
 2016 Abbar el Hamada
 2019 Sahari

Featured in
 1998 A pesar de las heridas – Cantos de las Mujeres Saharauis
 2003 Nar
 2009 Interrapcion – Crisol 09
 2010 Listen to the Banned

Awards and nominations
In 2009, she was a finalist for the Freedom to Create Prize, which celebrates the power of art to fight oppression, break down stereotypes and build trust in societies. In late April 2012, she won the Málaga Spanish Film Festival Best Original Soundtrack Silver , for her music of the movie .

Noted lyrics
Some of the lyrics of her songs are poems that she had heard from her grandmother El-Jadra Mint Mabruk, known as "the poet of the rifle" in the Sahrawi refugee camps

External links

See also
Music of Western Sahara
Nayim Alal

References

1976 births
Living people
People from Tindouf Province
Sahrawi singers
Arabic-language singers
Sahrawi actresses